This page lists the municipal flags of Kansai region, Japan. It is a part of the List of Japanese municipal flags, which is split into regions due to its size.

Complete lists of Japanese municipal flags pages

 List of municipal flags of Hokkaidō
 List of municipal flags of Tōhoku region
 List of municipal flags of Kantō region
 List of municipal flags of Chūbu region
 List of municipal flags of Kansai region
 List of municipal flags of Chūgoku region
 List of municipal flags of Shikoku
 List of municipal flags of Kyūshū

Mie Prefecture

Cities

Towns

Shiga Prefecture

Cities

Towns

Kyoto Prefecture

Cities

Towns and villages

Osaka Prefecture

Cities

Towns and villages

Hyōgo Prefecture

Cities

Towns and villages

Nara Prefecture

Cities

Towns and villages

Wakayama Prefecture

Cities

Towns and villages

Municipal